The Australian Champion Three Year Old is awarded annually to the three-year-old Thoroughbred horse whose performances in Australia are deemed to be the most impressive throughout the racing season.

There are two categories, Champion Three Year Old Filly and Champion Three Year Old Colt/Gelding.
Prior to 2005 the award was contested by both sexes.

Australian Champion Three Year Old Filly

Australian Champion Three Year Old Colt/Gelding

Australian Champion Three Year Old

Other Australian Thoroughbred awards
Australian Champion Racehorse of the Year
Australian Champion Two Year Old
Australian Champion Sprinter
Australian Champion Middle Distance Racehorse
Australian Champion Stayer
Australian Champion Filly or Mare
Australian Champion International Performer
Australian Champion Jumper
Australian Champion Trainer

See also

 List of millionaire racehorses in Australia

References

Australian Thoroughbred racing awards